Qarah Gol-e Gharbi (also Romanized as Qarah Gol-e Gharbī) is a village in Maraveh Tappeh Rural District, in the Central District of Maraveh Tappeh County, Golestan Province, Iran. At the 2006 census, its population was 756, in 139 families.

References 

Populated places in Maraveh Tappeh County